Nigel Richards may refer to:

Nigel Richards (actor), English actor and singer
Nigel Richards (Scrabble player), New Zealand Scrabble player
Nigel Richards (British Army officer) (1945–2019), British general